Al Ittihad Alexandria, also known as Al Ittihad Elsakandry, is a basketball club based in the city of Alexandria, Egypt. The team plays in the Egyptian Basketball Premier League. The team is widely considered one of the basketball powerhouse of Egypt, having won 13 championships. 

Ittihad has won the FIBA Africa Champions Cup in 1987, crowning itself African champions. The team has also won the Arab Championship seven times.

Honours

Domestic
Egyptian Super League
Winners (13): 1979 , 1982 , 1983 , 1984  , 1986 , 1987 , 1990 , 1992 , 1996 , 1999 , 2009 , 2010 , 2020 
Egyptian Cup
Winners (11): 1976, 1978, 1982 ,1983, 1984, 1986 1989, 2010, 2012, 2020, 2021
Egyptian Super Cup
Winners (3): 2020, 2021, 2022

International
FIBA Africa Champions Cup
Winners (1): 1987
Runners-up (1): 1996
Fourth place (1): 2012
Arab Championship
Winners (7): 1987, 1991, 1994, 1996, 2002, 2019

Players

Current roster

Notable players

 Ismail Ahmed: (1993–1997; 2001–2003; 2020–2022)
 Mouhanad El-Sabagh: (2006–2016)
 Mouloukou Diabate: (2021)
 Corey Webster: (2021–2022)

Season by season

Head coaches
 Ahmed Marei: (2019–2022)
 Henrik Rödl: (2022–present)

Notes

References

External links
Team profile at Africabasket.com

Basketball teams established in 1914
Basketball teams in Egypt
Sports clubs in Alexandria
Basketball